Dypsis humilis is a rare species of stemless palm that was discovered in Madagascar in 2007 by a collaboration between botanists from Madagascar and Royal Botanical Gardens, Kew. Fewer than ten plants were observed in an area that is threatened by logging and other human activity.

Description
Dypsis humilis is a low growing palm with no visible stem ("acaulescent"), and approximately eight leaves sprouting from the ground—described as looking "like a shuttlecock". The species is quite distinct from other Dypsis species in Madagascar, with only two other acaulescent species previously recorded—both of which have very different leaves and habitat.

Taxonomy
The plant was named and described in 2009 by Kew scientists Melinda Trudgen, Mijoro Rakotoarinivo, and William Baker. The specific epithet, humilis, refers to the low growing habit, or "humble" height of the plant.

Distribution and habitat
Dypsis humilis grows in northeast Madagascar, near the Antainambalana River, outside of Maroantsetra, a seaport town on the Bay of Antongil. It is found in rainforest on a granitic ridge top between  elevation. Fewer than ten plants were seen, in an area of forest disturbed by human activity, including logging.

Conservation
The plant is provisionally listed as Critically Endangered, the highest risk category for wild plants, by the IUCN Red List. The only known plants are in an unprotected area just outside Makira Natural Park, so the species' survival is not very secure. Madagascar has less than 10% of its native vegetation intact, with an additional 200,000-300,000 hectares of forest lost each year. Out of 172 Madagascar palm species known in 2007, only 18 are not threatened by habitat loss, with many on the edge of extinction.

References

humilis
Endemic flora of Madagascar
Critically endangered plants
Plants described in 2009
Flora of the Madagascar lowland forests